Rainer Walter Kühne (born 23 May 1970) is a German theoretical physicist. He became widely known for his work on Plato's Atlantis.

Education and early life

Rainer Walter Kühne was born in 1970 in Braunschweig, Germany. He got his diploma in physics from the University of Bonn in 1995 and the Dr. rer. nat. in 2001 from the University of Dortmund.

Research

Kühne worked on the subjects of cold fusion, cosmology, gravitation physics, and quantum field theory. His dissertation "Thermodynamics of Heisenberg Chains Coupled to Phonons" was on the subject of thermodynamics.

Kühne became widely known for his work on Plato's Atlantis. Kühne argued that the Atlantis story is philosophical fiction which includes historical elements. These historical elements include the Iron Age city of Tartessos and the war of the Bronze Age Sea Peoples. Kühne's theory is mainly based on the works of Adolf Schulten and Spyridon Marinatos.

A number of mass media reported on Kühne's Atlantis work. These include National Geographic, New Scientist, and BBC.

In 2006 and 2009 two archaeological and geological expeditions were performed in the Spanish Donana National Park in order to test Kühne's Atlantis-Tartessos theory. These expeditions were headed by archaeologist Sebastian Celestino Perez and historian Richard Freund. The geological results were published in three peer-reviewed journal papers. The archaeological results were published in Richard Freund's book "Digging through History". The National Geographic documentary "Finding Atlantis" (March 2011) reported about the 2009 expedition.

Main results of the two expeditions include evidence of four tsunamis between 2100 BC and 200 BC, numerous pottery sherds and geophysical evidence of an archaeological site.

References

1970 births
Living people
Theoretical physicists
20th-century German physicists